Jorge Mendonça may refer to:
Jorge Mendonça (footballer, born 1938), Angolan footballer
Jorge Mendonça (footballer, born 1954) (1954-2006), Brazilian footballer